Ebaeides palliata is a species of longhorn beetle in the tribe Apomecynini. It was described by Pascoe in 1864.

References

Ebaeides
Beetles described in 1864